The 2012 Marina Bay GP2 Series round was a pair of motor races held at the Marina Bay Street Circuit in Marina Bay, Singapore as part the GP2 Series, with the 2012 GP3 Series season having concluded at the previous round at Monza. The races were held on 22 and 23 September and was run in support of the Singapore Grand Prix, and represented the final round of the 2012 GP2 Series season. The event marked the first time the GP2 Series had travelled to Singapore.

Davide Valsecchi was declared the 2012 series champion after he out-scored title rival Luiz Razia in the feature race. Giedo van der Garde won the sprint race.

Classification

Qualifying

Feature race

Notes:
As lap 28 marked the first lap over one hour of racing, the number of laps was reduced.

Sprint race

Notes:
 — Johnny Cecotto Jr. was given a three-place grid penalty for crossing the white pit exit line when rejoining the circuit during the feature race.
 — Fabio Onidi was given a five-place grid penalty for causing an avoidable accident during the feature race.

Standings after the round

GP2 standings

Drivers' Championship standings

Teams' Championship standings

 Note: Only the top five positions are included for both sets of standings.

References

Marina Bay
GP2